Below is the list of the winners at the Denmark Open in badminton in men's doubles.

References
Alle tidligere vindere af Denmark Open (tidl. Danish Open) 

Denmark Open